La Casta Susana is a 1944 Argentine film released on October 11 of that year. It is based on the operetta Die keusche Susanne.

External links
 

1944 films
1944 musical films
Argentine musical films
1940s Spanish-language films
Films directed by Benito Perojo
Argentine black-and-white films
Films based on operettas
1940s Argentine films